Crazy But It's True is the second studio album by American rapper Lil Gotit. It was released on March 13, 2019, by Alamo Records.

Background 
The album includes eighteen songs in total and features collaborators such as Gunna, Gotit's older brother Lil Keed, Lil Durk, Hoodrich Pablo Juan, Yung Mal, and Money Man. On the production side, Dun Deal, Supah Mario, 10Fifty, and Atlanta go-to Wheezy provided the bass beats for album's distinct approach. The album is his second studio album after Hood Baby, which was released earlier in November 2018. According to Lil Gotit, the album was named for his upbringing since Hood Baby and new rapping style.

Singles 
"Da Real HoodBabies" was released as the lead single from the album, with a music video released in February 2019 on YouTube. The song was later remixed by rapper Lil Baby.

Track listing 
Credits adapted from Tidal, BMI and ASCAP.

References 

2019 albums
Lil Gotit albums
Albums produced by Cubeatz